David Koch (1940–2019) was a United States businessman and 1980 U.S. Libertarian Party Vice Presidential candidate.

David Koch may also refer to:
David Koch (television presenter) (born 1956), Australian television personality
David Koch (Australian politician) (born 1949), Australian Liberal member of the Victorian Legislative Council

my:ဒေးဗစ် ကော့ချ်